Tuvalu sends athletes to the IAAF World Championships in Athletics to compete in the 100 metres. The sprinters have set Tuvaluan records and personal best times, but have not proceeded beyond the preliminary heats. The Tuvalu Athletics Association (TAA) is the governing body for the sport of athletics in the Tuvalu.

History

References

Nations at the World Athletics Championships
 
Athletics in Tuvalu